Mullá Muḥammad-i-Zarandí (29 July 1831 – 1892), more commonly known as Nabíl-i-Aẓam ( "the Great Nabíl") or Nabíl-i-Zarandí ( "Nabíl of Zarand"), was an eminent Baháʼí historian during the time of Baháʼu'lláh, and one of the nineteen Apostles of Baháʼu'lláh. He is most famous for authoring The Dawn-Breakers, which stands out as one of the most important and extensive accounts of the ministry of the Báb.

He learned about the Bábí Faith at the age of sixteen and met Baháʼu'lláh in 1851. He made several journeys on behalf of Baháʼu'lláh, was imprisoned in Egypt and is the only person known to have made the two pilgrimages to the House of the Báb in Shíráz and the House of Baháʼu'lláh in Baghdad in accordance with the rites set out by Baháʼu'lláh. After the passing of Baháʼu'lláh, and at the request of ʻAbdu'l-Bahá, he arranged a Tablet of Visitation from Baháʼu'lláh's writings which is now used in the Holy Shrines. Shortly afterwards, overcome with grief, love and longing for Baháʼu'lláh, he drowned himself into the sea.

Background
Nabíl was born in Zarand, Iran on 29 July 1831. He was a shepherd but strove to overcome his meagre education. He would often go with his father to Qom and listen to religious discourses, and he learned to read the Qurʼan. In 1847, Nabíl, while in the village of Rubat-Karim, overheard a conversation about the Báb and was immediately interested. Later, when he was more fully informed of the religion of the Báb through Siyyid Husayn-i-Zavari'i, he became a believer in the new movement. He tried to join the Bábís at Shaykh Tabarsi but the siege began before he could get there. He took up residence in Tehran in the same madrisih as the transcriber of the Báb's writings; there he also met many Bábís who lived in or were travelling through the town, including Baháʼu'lláh.

In 1852 there was an attempt on the life of Naser al-Din Shah Qajar, which was followed by the persecution of the Bábí community. During this time, Nabíl put forward a claim to leadership of the Bábí community stating that he had received divine inspiration. Later, when he visited Baghdad and instead recognized Baháʼu'lláh's claim, he withdrew his own.

Travels
From Baghdad and Adrianople, Baháʼu'lláh sent Nabíl on numerous journeys to the Bábís of Iran. During 1867/8 his major task was to inform the Bábís of Baháʼu'lláh's claim to be He whom God shall make manifest. On one journey, he performed the pilgrimage to the house of the Báb in Shiraz and the house of Baháʼu'lláh in Baghdad, making him the first to perform the pilgrimage according to Baháʼu'lláh's laws.

In 1868 Nabíl was sent by Baháʼu'lláh to Egypt where he was imprisoned. When he was freed, Nabíl journeyed to ʻAkká, but after being recognized by the followers of Azal who had stationed themselves near the gate of the city, he was removed from the city. He travelled around the area including living on Mount Carmel and in Nazareth until he was able to enter ʻAkká. On his second attempt to enter the prison city he was able to stay 81 days, meeting Mírzá Áqá Ján and then Baháʼu'lláh.

After this, he was sent by Baháʼu'lláh again to Iran to confirm the belief of many of the Baháʼís. In 1888 he began writing The Dawn-Breakers with the personal assistance of Mírzá Músá, the brother of Baháʼu'lláh. It was finished in about a year and a half, and parts of the manuscript were reviewed and approved, some by Baháʼu'lláh, and others by ʻAbdu'l-Bahá.

Death
After his return from Iran, he lived in ʻAkká until Baháʼu'lláh's death in 1892. Overwhelmed with Baháʼu'lláh's death, he drowned himself in the sea and his dead body was found washed ashore near the city of ʻAkká.

Besides writing a lengthy history of the Baháʼí Faith, he wrote poetry about the historical events of the religion, which he would send to the Baháʼís of Iran. His poetry, however, has not been published. A tablet by Baháʼu'lláh addresses him by name, describing him as "numbered with My favoured ones whose names the Finger of God hath inscribed."

Notes

References

External links
 

Apostles of Baháʼu'lláh
Iranian Bahá'ís
Bahá'í poets
Suicides by drowning
1831 births
1892 deaths
19th-century Bahá'ís